Muracypraea is a genus of sea snails, marine gastropod mollusks in the family Cypraeidae, the cowries.

Species
Species within the genus Muracypraea include:
Muracypraea donmoorei (Petuch, 1979)
Muracypraea mus (Linnaeus, 1758)

References

Cypraeidae